Sahara Avenue is a major east-west roadway in the Las Vegas Valley. The former State Route 589 (SR 589) comprised a large portion of the street. The roadway is named after the Sahara Hotel and Casino,  which itself is named after the Sahara desert. The casino is located on Las Vegas Boulevard where the boulevard intersects with Sahara Avenue.

Route description

Sahara Avenue begins in the western valley at Red Rock Ranch Road as the continuation of Desert Foothills Drive west of the Las Vegas Beltway.
SR 589 began in the western Las Vegas Valley at its intersection with Rainbow Boulevard (SR 595).  From there, the route continued due east to cross Interstate 15 and Las Vegas Boulevard. SR 589 proceeded further east to cross Fremont Street/Boulder Highway (SR 582), entering the unincorporated town of Sunrise Manor, passing under I-515/US 93/US 95 and terminated at Nellis Boulevard (SR 612). Sahara Avenue ends at the Hollywood Regional Park, just east of Hollywood Boulevard.

Through much of the Las Vegas area, Sahara Avenue comprises the southern boundary of the City of Las Vegas.  At the intersection of Las Vegas Boulevard, Sahara Avenue marks what is typically considered the northern boundary of the Las Vegas Strip.

History
The road was originally called San Francisco Avenue and served as the southern city limit for Las Vegas.

In the 1960s, city planners envisioned construction of an expressway along Sahara to Rainbow Boulevard.

The Nevada Department of Transportation (NDOT) removed SR 589 from its maintenance logs by the beginning of 2019, and has begun the process of turning ownership of the roadway over to the City of Las Vegas and Clark County.

Major intersections
Junctions listed are for SR 589 only.

Attractions
 Sahara Las Vegas
 Palace Station
 Bonanza Gift Shop
 The Golden Steer Steakhouse
 The Historic Commercial Center District

Public transport
Current RTC Route Sahara Avenue Express (SX) operated on this road.

See also

References

1976 establishments in Nevada
2018 disestablishments in Nevada
Streets in Las Vegas
Streets in the Las Vegas Valley